Balsamorhiza hispidula  is a North American species of plants in the sunflower tribe within the aster family. It is native to western United States, primarily the Great Basin and other dry, relatively flat terrain. It has been found in Idaho, Montana, Wyoming, Oregon, Nevada, Colorado, Utah, and Arizona.

Balsamorhiza hispidula is an herb up to 40 cm (16 inches) tall. It has yellow flower heads, usually borne one at a time, with both ray florets and disc florets.

References

External links

hispidula
Plants described in 1935
Flora of the Western United States
Flora without expected TNC conservation status